The St. John's Red Storm men's soccer team represents St. John's University in New York City, New York in all in NCAA Division I soccer competitions. They compete in the Big East Conference and have experienced consistent success in both conference and national competitions. From 1992 to 2013, the Red Storm went to the NCAA Division I Men's Soccer Tournament in 20 of 22 seasons, with four appearances in the College Cup semifinals and two appearances in the final, winning the national championship in 1996. The team posted 27 consecutive seasons with a win percentage of .500 or better from 1987 to 2013 before suffering three consecutive losing seasons from 2014 to 2016.

In conference play, the St. John's men's soccer team has won six conference regular season championships and nine conference tournament championships; the most recent being in 2011. They are currently coached by Dave Masur who will be in his 24th season leading the Red Storm in 2014.

Record by year
References:

References

External links